Jan Vorel (born 1 September 1978) is a Czech retired football defender who played in the Czech First League principally for Blšany and Dukla Prague. He represented his country at youth level between 1997 and 1998.

Career
Born in Prague, he played for the youth teams of Prague clubs Viktoria Žižkov and FK Dukla Prague before joining the ranks of FK Chmel Blšany youth side aged 14. After a loan spell at FC Xaverov Horní Počernice he broke into the senior team at Blšany where he spent the majority of his career, making 197 appearances for the club, aiding their promotion to the 1st Division in 1998. He served as club captain during his time at Blšany.

Between 1997 and 1998, Vorel represented numerous national football teams of the Czech Republic including the Czech Republic U21 team, for whom he made six appearances.

After FK Chmel Blšany's relegation from top tier football in 2006, Vorel he was loaned out to Slavia Prague, with the option for a permanent transfer at the end of the 2006/07 season. He made 8 starts, 11 appearances overall, during his stay at Slavia, helping the team to second place in the league. The club however decided against signing the player.

In 2007, he left the Czech League, completing a move to Aris Limassol in Cyprus. Limassol were relegated from the Cypriot First Division at the end of the 2007/08 season after finishing 12th.

In 2008, Vorel returned to the Czech Republic, signing for FK Dukla Prague, the club he played for as a youngster. Following Dukla's promotion in 2011, Vorel played in the Czech First League for the first time in more than four years on 29 July 2011. He functioned as captain during his time at Dukla. In November 2012, Vorel extended his contract with Dukla until the summer of 2014. In March 2013, Vorel played the shortest match of his life, being sent off after just 20 seconds in a league match for Dukla against Plzeň, which Dukla went on to lose 4–0. Vorel was again sent off in the fourth match of the 2013–14 season, receiving a four-game suspension following a two-footed challenge on Slavia striker Dávid Škutka. In October 2013, he scored Dukla's third goal in a 4–0 Czech Cup victory against Pribram. He left Dukla and ended his professional career, joining amateur side Všenorský SK in the summer of 2015.

Career statistics

References

External links 
 
 
 Jan Vorel at Dukla Prague 
 

1978 births
Living people
Czech footballers
Czech expatriate footballers
Czech Republic under-21 international footballers
Czech Republic youth international footballers
Czech First League players
Cypriot First Division players
Association football defenders
FK Chmel Blšany players
SK Slavia Prague players
Aris Limassol FC players
FK Dukla Prague players
Expatriate footballers in Cyprus
Footballers from Prague